Francesco Mimbelli (D 561) is the second ship of the Durand de la Penne-class destroyer of the Italian Navy.

Development  
The Durand de Le Penne-class are escort and combat class ships, able to operate in every combat condition, and especially devised to survive to heavy missile and aircraft attacks. Its construction is made almost totally with steel; the structure is a continuous deck with a low, large stern, to accommodate the helicopter force. The fore hull is very pointed, with a very pronounced sea-cutter structure. The superstructure consists of two blocks, relatively low and wide, both with a high, antenna mast with a triangular cross-section for all the electronic. The engines exhausts are in two groups, one for each superstructure: the aft has two exhausts flank to flank, slightly inclined. Then there is the Standard missile system and finally the helicopter facilities.

Construction and career 
She is laid down on 15 November 1989 and launched on 13 April 1991 by Fincantieri shipyards. Commissioned on 18 October 1993 with the hull number D 561.

Francesco Mimbelli suffered a fire in one of the engine rooms, while it was underway, as part of Operation Safe Sea on 29 December 2019. The fire-fighting teams on board, specially trained to deal with these emergencies, intervened effectively, immediately securing the unit and extinguishing the fire, without any consequences or damage to the crew. The ship continued its navigation autonomously and is now heading towards the port of Augusta, for the necessary checks.

Gallery

References

External links
 Destroyer Francesco Mimbelli Marina Militare website

Durand de la Penne-class destroyers
1991 ships
Ships built by Fincantieri